Kapp Lee is a headland of Edgeøya, Svalbard. It is the northwestern point of the island, and is located north of Dolerittneset. South of Kapp Lee, and north of Dolerittneset, is a suitable harbour site for vessels.

References

Headlands of Svalbard
Edgeøya